The 1977 President Park's Cup Football Tournament was the seventh competition of Korea Cup.

Group stage

Group A

Group B

Knockout stage

Bracket

Semi-finals

Third place play-off

Final

See also
Korea Cup
South Korea national football team results

External links
President Park's Cup 1977 (South Korea) at RSSSF

1977